Tonaknock Cross is a high cross and National Monument located in County Kerry, Ireland.

Location

Tonaknock Cross is located on the Ardfert–Lixnaw road.

History
Tonaknock Abbey, a collegiate church of the Canons Regular, was established here in the 7th century; the cross was probably erected between then and the 9th century and represents an early stage in the development of the Irish high cross. Local legend says the south arm was broken by a cannonball during the 16th century Desmond Rebellions. It was found buried in a field and was re-erected.

Description
It is believed to date from the 9th century.

References

Archaeological sites in County Kerry
National Monuments in County Kerry